Loniu is an Austronesian language spoken along the southern coast of Los Negros Island in the Manus Province, immediately east of Manus Island in Manus Province, Papua New Guinea. Loniu is spoken in the villages of Loniu and Lolak, and there are estimated to be 450–500 native speakers, although some live in other Manus villages or on the mainland of Papua New Guinea.

Loniu generally fits with most of the observations made about Oceanic languages, specifically the Admiralty Islands languages. The six morphosyntactic features of 'Type B' Oceanic Languages (which include the Admiralties languages) as noted by Ross are found in Loniu. The language is essentially SVO and contains prepositions.

Phonology

Consonant Phonemes

Vowel Phonemes

References

Notes

Sources

External links 
 Kaipuleohone's Robert Blust collection includes written and recorded materials from Loniu

Manus languages
Languages of Manus Province